Metailurus is a genus of saber-toothed cat in the family Felidae, and belonging to the tribe Metailurini, which occurred in North America, Eurasia and Africa from the Miocene to the Middle Pleistocene. This genus was formally described by O. Zdansky in 1924. Metailurus minor has been reassigned to the felid genus Yoshi.

Description
The canines of Metailurus are longer than those of even the clouded leopard, but significantly shorter than true saber teeth, and more conical than bladed. A partial skeleton found in the Turolian site of Kerassia 1 consists of the jawbone, the anterior and posterior limb bone elements, and some sternal bones and some vertebrae. This is the most complete known of the species. Its dental material is comparative to those specimens from Pikerm, Chomateri, and China. The presence of elongated posterior limbs indicate that it had developed jumping skills.

References

External links
 

Metailurini
Miocene felids
Pliocene carnivorans
Pliocene extinctions
Prehistoric carnivoran genera
Cenozoic mammals of North America
Cenozoic mammals of Africa
Neogene mammals of Asia
Cenozoic mammals of Europe
Fossil taxa described in 1924